Attalia ('The Vanguard') was an Arabic language weekly newspaper published from Tripoli, Libya. Attalia was founded in 1958, and served as the organ of the ICFTU-affiliated Libyan General Workers Union. As of 1961 it had a circulation of 5,000. As of 1961 Salem Shita functioned as the proprietor of the newspaper and Ali Batar as its editor. As of 1968 French diplomatic circles estimated that the circulation of Attalia was 2,800. As of 1969 Salem Shita served as both proprietor and editor of Attalia.

References

Newspapers published in Libya
Arabic-language newspapers
Publications established in 1958
Weekly newspapers
Trade unions in Libya